The Wench Is Dead is a historical crime novel by Colin Dexter, the eighth novel in the Inspector Morse series. The novel received the Gold Dagger Award in 1989.

Plot summary
In 1859, the body of a young woman was found floating in the Oxford Canal; her death led to a sensational murder trial, and two men were eventually hanged for the murder.

In 1989, Inspector Morse is recovering from a bleeding ulcer in Oxford's John Radcliffe Hospital. Morse is given a book by the wife of a recently deceased patient at the hospital. The little book called Murder on the Oxford Canal tells the story of the murder of Joanna Franks aboard the canal boat Barbara Bray. Morse is soon convinced that the two men hanged for the crime were innocent and sets out to prove it from the confines of his bed.

Explanation of the title
The title of the novel comes from Christopher Marlowe's play The Jew of Malta; the following quotation serves as the epigraph to the novel:

FRIAR BARNARDINE. Thou hast committed--
BARABAS. Fornication:  but that was in another country;
And besides, the wench is dead.

T.S. Eliot used the same quote as an ironic prologue to his poem Portrait of a Lady (poem).

References to actual events
Colin Dexter based the novel on the 1839 murder of 37-year-old Christina Collins as she travelled the Trent and Mersey Canal at Rugeley, Staffordshire, on the Staffordshire Knot en route to London. Of the four crewmen, captain James Owen and boatman George Thomas were hanged for the murder by William Calcraft and assistant George Smith, while boatman William Ellis was transported for his involvement (following a last minute reprieve from his death sentence), and cabin boy William Muston was not charged. The evidence was largely circumstantial; the three accused were drunk at the time of the woman's death, numerous witnesses attested to Collins being distressed as the men used sexually explicit language towards her, and all four men (including the cabin boy) were seen to have lied in court in an attempt to pin the blame on each other and to escape punishment. The three accused stated that Collins jumped into the canal of her own accord and drowned, despite the fact that the water at the particular section of the canal was less than four feet in depth. Alan Hayhurst, author of 2008 book Staffordshire Murders states that "this author does not agree with Mr Dexter's conclusions!"

According to the dedication to the novel, it was Harry Judge, a "lover of canals", who introduced Dexter to the small book The Murder of Christina Collins by John Godwin, a local historian and former headteacher in Rugeley. The booklet gives many details of Christina’s early life and the criminal trial that followed her murder.

Much of the research for the novel was carried out at the William Salt Library in Stafford. Dexter recalls that he spent "a good many fruitful hours in the library" consulting contemporary newspaper reports of Christina's murder.

The novel's framing device, of a detective solving an historical murder while laid up in hospital, was most famously used by the mystery novelist Josephine Tey in her 1951 novel, The Daughter of Time – in that case, the murder of the Princes in the Tower.

Awards and nominations
The Wench Is Dead won the British Crime Writers' Association Gold Dagger Award for the best crime novel of the year in 1989.

Adaptations
The novel was filmed as an episode in Inspector Morse and was first aired on 11 November 1998.  The filming took place on the Grand Union Canal at Braunston locks, south of Braunston Tunnel and on the Kennet and Avon Canal, all broad canals, whereas the Oxford Canal is a narrow canal. The historical office and loading scenes were filmed at the Black Country Museum in Dudley. The Barge Inn at Honeystreet, Vale of Pewsey, Wiltshire, was used in many scenes and pictures from the filming are on their website. The boats were provided by South Midland Water Transport. Barbara Bray is actually Australia, built in 1894 by Fellows Morton & Clayton. Trafalgar was Northolt built in 1899 by the same firm. Fazeley built in 1921 is also used but carries two names. Three motor boats (Archimedes, Clover and Jaguar) were used to tow the unpowered horse boats around the country to the various locations which involved a two-week trip.

A BBC Radio 4 play The Wench Is Dead dramatised by Guy Meredith was broadcast in 1992 starring John Shrapnel as Morse and Robert Glenister as Lewis, with Garard Green as Col. Deniston, Joanna Myers as Christine Greenaway, Peter Penry-Jones as Waggy Greenaway, and Kate Binchy as Sister MacLean. The play was directed by Ned Chaillet.

Publication history
1989, London: Macmillan , Pub date 26 October 1990, Hardback
1990, New York: St. Martin's Press , Pub date May 1990, Hardback
1991, New York: Bantam , Pub date 1 May 1991, Paperback
1991, London: Pan , Pub date 12 July 1991, Paperback

References

Further reading 
 Bird, Christopher, The World of Inspector Morse: A Complete A-Z Reference for the Morse Enthusiast Foreword by Colin Dexter, London: Boxtree (1998) 
 Bishop, David, The Complete Inspector Morse: From the Original Novels to the TV Series London: Reynolds & Hearn (2006)  
 Mary Jean DeMarr (ed.),  In the Beginning, USA: Bowling Green University Popular Press (1995)

External links
 The Real Life Murder of Christina Collins at The Inspector Morse Society

1989 British novels
Novels adapted into radio programs
British novels adapted into television shows
Novels by Colin Dexter
Novels set in Oxford
Macmillan Publishers books